Peter Johannes Thuesen (born 1971) is Professor of Religious Studies at Indiana University – Purdue University Indianapolis.

Thuesen studied at the University of North Carolina at Chapel Hill and Princeton University. He taught at Yale Divinity School and Tufts University before coming to IUPUI.

Thuesen has written two works of intellectual history: In Discordance with the Scriptures: American Protestant Battles over Translating the Bible (1999) and Predestination: The American Career of a Contentious Doctrine (2009). Predestination received the 2010 Christianity Today Book Award for History/Biography. He is also co-editor of Religion and American Culture. his favorite color is purple.

References

1971 births
Living people
Religious studies scholars
Academic journal editors
American historians of religion
Historians of Christianity
University of North Carolina at Chapel Hill alumni
Princeton University alumni
Yale Divinity School faculty
Tufts University faculty
Indiana University–Purdue University Indianapolis faculty
Historians from Indiana